Falerio dei Colli Ascolani is a denominazione di origine controllata white wine that is located in the region of Marche, in Italy.  The DOC was created in 1975.

Geography
The region lies on the eastern coast of Italy, encompassing the towns of Civitanova Marche, San Benedetto del Tronto and Ascoli Piceno.  The wine region is one of the southernmost DOCs in the Marche.

History
The name of the DOC can be traced back to Roman times, and is named after the ancient Roman city of Faleria, which is now the modern day commune of Falerone.

The Passerina and Pecorino Grapes
Falerio dei Colli Ascolani, like many wines of the Marche, is unique in its use of rare local Italian varietals that are seldom found anywhere else, here the Passerina and Pecorino grape varietals.  The blend requires a minimum of 20% and a maximum of 50% Trebbiano Toscano, 10% to 30% Passerina, 10% to 30% Pecorino and up to 20% other white varietals.

References

Italian DOC
Province of Ascoli Piceno
Wines of Marche